The 1995 Canadian National Soccer League season was the third season of the league under the Canadian National Soccer League name, and the seventy-third season in the league's history. The season began on May 26, 1995, with London City facing Scarborough Astros at Cove Road Stadium. The season concluded on November 2, 1995, with St. Catharines Wolves claiming their second CNSL Championship after defeating Toronto Jets in a two-game series.  

The CNSL lost its presence in Quebec and became solely located in the province of Ontario. The league also received some local competition with the advent of the Canadian International Soccer League (Puma League). The league managed to recruit Parma FC, who were the 1994–95 UEFA Cup champions for their All-Star match.

Overview  
Since the conclusion of the 1993 season, the CNSL went through a tumultuous period throughout the remainder of the 1990s. The territorial boundaries of the league were further reduced from the Montreal-Windsor corridor and became primarily restricted within the Golden Horseshoe area in Ontario. Both of the league's franchises in Montreal departed with the Montreal Ramblers relocating to the American-based USISL Pro League under the name New Hampshire Ramblers, and Montreal Croatia folding. The CNSL also experienced direct competition from the newly formed Canadian International Soccer League (Puma League), which received sponsorship from Puma. The Puma League was centered around the Toronto area with ethnically supported teams and was able to attract Toronto Croatia in defecting.  

The results of these events caused a decrease in league membership to six teams with all the clubs being located in the province of Ontario. After a twelve-year absence in the Hamilton region, the league returned with the acceptance of the Hamilton White Eagles. The previous time the city was represented in the CNSL was in the 1983 season when the Hamilton Steelers competed in the league. Former league commissioner and Toronto Italia owner Rocco Lofranco resigned, and the league took over the Toronto franchise. Various reports claimed that Lofranco had intentions of acquiring the franchise rights of the Toronto Rockets to receive entry into the American Professional Soccer League, but the Rockets ownership refused to relinquish their territorial rights.

Teams

Final standings

Playoffs

Finals 
 

 
St. Catharines won 3–2 on aggregate.

Cup   
The cup tournament (known as the Umbro Cup for sponsorship reasons) was a separate contest from the rest of the season, in which all six teams took part. All the matches were separate from the regular season. Teams played each other once home and away in the Cup competition, and the first and second place teams would play a singles match for the Cup.

Matches

Finals 

St. Catharines won 3–0 on penalties.

All-Star game  
The all-star match was held in Toronto, Ontario at Varsity Stadium, and the league arranged for Parma FC the 1994–95 UEFA Cup champions as the opposition for the match.

Individual awards  
The annual Canadian National Soccer League awards ceremony was held at the North York Council Chambers in North York, Ontario with an attendance of around 200 people. The master of the ceremony was future Hamilton Bulldogs president Cary Kaplan, who was operating as the secretary of the league. London and St. Catharines were tied each with two awards being given to the clubs. Mark Konert was named the Coach of the Year after leading St. Catharines to a double, which consisted of the CNSL Championship, and Umbro Cup. Wolves midfielder Chris Handsor was voted the MVP, and would go on to play in the USL A-League, and play a prominent role in indoor soccer throughout North America. 

London City was given the Most Disciplined Team award for being the most disciplined team throughout the season, and John Bottineau received the Rookie of the Year. The remainder of the awards such as the Golden Boot went to Scarborough Astros Laszlo Martonfi, and Joe Ciaravino of the Toronto Jets was named the Goalkeeper of the Year. Les Wilcox was named the Referee of the Year.
 

 First Team All-Stars

References

External links
RSSSF CNSL page
thecnsl.com - 1995 season

1995 domestic association football leagues
Canadian National Soccer League
1995